Calvary Baptist Church is a Baptist church located in the Chinatown neighborhood in Washington, D.C. affiliated with the American Baptist Churches USA, the Cooperative Baptist Fellowship, the Baptist Peace Fellowship of North America, the Alliance of Baptists, the District of Columbia Baptist Convention, and the Association of Welcoming and Affirming Baptists. It severed ties with the Southern Baptist Convention in July 2012. Since 2017, Calvary's Senior Co-Pastors have been Rev. Sally Sarratt and Rev. Maria Swearingen.

History
The church was founded in 1862.

In accordance with the vision statement, Calvary concentrated on its relationship with the Latino, and especially Salvadoran population by introducing bilingual services and partnering with a church in El Salvador, led by Rev. Edgar Palacios. Calvary has been active in immigration reform efforts, along with the issue of marriage equality.

In 1983, Calvary founded the Calvary Women's Shelter, now Calvary Women's Services, the first women's homeless shelter in Washington Metro area. 

Calvary has played a significant role in Baptist life as the founding church of the Northern Baptist Convention (now the American Baptist Churches USA) in 1907, a leading church of the Baptist Sunday School movement at the turn of the century, and is unique in Baptist life for having simultaneously had the presidents of the American Baptists, then pastor Clarence Cranford, and that of the Southern Baptists, former Democratic member of Congress from Arkansas Brooks Hays, as members of the congregation. 

Calvary's sanctuary building was designed by the US-German architect Adolf Cluss, who also designed a number of other leading buildings in Washington.

Senior pastors
 Sally Sarratt and Maria Swearingen (married), 2017–current
 Amy Butler, 2003–2014
 Lynn Bergfalk, 1987–2000
 George W. Hill, 1971–1986
 Clarence Cranford, 1942–1971
 William S. Abernethy, 1921–1941
 Samuel Harrison Greene, 1880–1920
 Auguste Frank Mason, 1876–1879
 Joseph Parker, 1870–1875
 Thomas R. Howlett, 1863–1869
 Joseph Spencer Kennard, 1862

Historic members
As a church in Washington, it has had a number of high-profile members including:

 Amos Kendall, the 8th United States Postmaster General and provided significant funding to found the church. The first floor of Calvary's sanctuary building is called Kendall Hall after Kendall.
 Charles Evans Hughes, the first president of the Northern Baptist Convention, the former Governor of New York, United States Secretary of State, and Chief Justice of the United States.
 President Warren G. Harding attended Calvary while President of the United States.
 William Shadrack Shallenberger, a former Republican member of Congress from Pennsylvania and appointed Second Assistant Postmaster General by President William McKinley. Shallenberger Hall, Calvary's largest meeting room, is named after him. Shallenberger served as the superintendent of the Sunday School and taught the Vaughn Class.
 Fred Schwengel, a former Republican member of Congress from Iowa and the founding president of the United States Capitol Historical Society. Schwengel lost re-election in 1972 after opposing prayer in school.
 Brooks Hays, a former Democratic member of Congress from Arkansas and president of the Southern Baptist Convention. Hays was defeated for re-election after attempting to mediate the Little Rock Integration Crisis
 George W. Hill was a former pastor of Calvary, a leader of the American Baptist Convention, often appeared in national newspapers and television, and was a national peace activist. His efforts led to the founding of the U.S. Institute of Peace.

References

External links                                                               

 

Affirming Baptist churches in the United States
1862 establishments in Washington, D.C.
Baptist churches in Washington, D.C.
Chinatown (Washington, D.C.)
Churches completed in 1866
Salvadoran-American culture